Pishunla Key (also Romanized as Pīshūnla Key; also known as Pīshūnlū Key) is a village in Senderk Rural District, Senderk District, Minab County, Hormozgan Province, Iran. At the 2006 census, its population was 584, in 128 families.

References 

Populated places in Minab County